The Probasco Fountain is a large fountain in Cincinnati, Ohio, United States.  Built of bronze on a base of granite, the fountain was constructed in 1887 according to a design by Samuel Hannaford.

The fountain is named for its donor, Henry Probasco, a Cincinnati resident who also gave the city the Tyler Davidson Fountain. Built as a drinking fountain for the residents of the surrounding neighborhood of Clifton, it is composed of four separate drinking basins: one each for humans, horses, dogs, and birds.

Located along Clifton Avenue near that street's intersection with Woolper Avenue, the Probasco Fountain is a contributing property to the Clifton Avenue Historic District,  which is listed on the National Register of Historic Places.  In 1980, the fountain itself was added to the Register, along with dozens of other buildings designed by Samuel Hannaford in Cincinnati and other parts of Hamilton County.

See also
Henry Probasco House
Drinking fountains in the United States

References

Buildings and structures completed in 1887
Bronze sculptures in Ohio
Fountains in Ohio
National Register of Historic Places in Cincinnati
Historic district contributing properties in Ohio
Drinking fountains in the United States
Buildings and structures on the National Register of Historic Places in Ohio